Beyond the Break is an American drama series about four women who join a competitive surfing circuit. It is set in Hawaii. The show was created by Michael D. Jacobs, David Brookwell and Sean McNamara. It aired on Noggin's teen programming block, The N. The series premiered on June 2, 2006, and aired its final episode on June 25, 2009.

Synopsis
The series focuses on four women in the sport of professional surfing. Birdie Scott (Tiffany Hines), Lacey Farmer (Natalie Ramsey), Dawn Preston (Suzie Pollard), and Kai Kealoha (Sonya Balmores) must overcome their differences in order to capture surf stardom. David Chokachi, Baywatch star, also stars as the girls' surfing instructor. Bailey Reese (Ross Thomas) and his sidekick Shoe (Jason Tam) round out the cast as two male surfers who have their eyes on Birdie and Dawn. Michael Copon has a recurring role as both Kai and Lacey's love interest.

Cast

Main
Natalie Ramsey as Lacey Farmer
Sonya Balmores as Kai Kealoha
Tiffany Hines as Birdie Scott
Suzie Pollard as Dawn Preston
David Chokachi as Justin Healy
Ross Thomas as Bailey Reese
Adam T. Brooks as DJ Reese (season 3)

Recurring and notable guests
Jesse Williams as Eric Medina (8 episodes)
Michael Copon as Vin Keahi
Jason Tam as Shoe
Olivia Munn as Mily Acuna
Kim Kardashian as Elle (4 episodes)
Aubrey Graham as himself
Scott Caudill as Dwayne/Duane, the biker (2 episodes)

Production and broadcast
The show debuted in June 2006. Of the first 20 episodes filmed, the first 10 were shown as Season 1, while the following 10 aired subsequently as Season 2. The N Soundtrack, released in 2006, contains songs from the series.

The third and final season of Beyond the Break, consisting of 14 episodes, first aired on the Canadian network Razer. After a two-year hiatus, it premiered in the United States on June 8, 2009 on The N. The series was briefly rerun in July 2012 on TeenNick, which promoted it as a "summer series".

Episodes

Series overview

Season 1 (2006)

Season 2 (2007)

Season 3 (2009)

References

External links
 
 

2006 American television series debuts
2009 American television series endings
2000s American teen drama television series
English-language television shows
Surfing mass media
Television shows set in Hawaii
Television series by Brookwell McNamara Entertainment
The N original programming
Women's surfing